Steve Booker may refer to:

Steve Booker (producer), British producer and songwriter 
Muruga Booker (born 1942), American drummer, recording artist, and Greek Orthodox Priest